2003–04 Pirveli Liga was the 15th season of the Georgian Pirveli Liga.

League standings

See also
2003–04 Umaglesi Liga
2003–04 Georgian Cup

External links
Georgia 2003/04 RSSSF

Erovnuli Liga 2 seasons
2003–04 in Georgian football
Georgia